This is a list of the main career statistics of former professional tennis player Jana Novotná.

Major finals

Grand Slam finals

Singles: 4 (1 title, 3 runner-ups)

Women's doubles: 23 (12 titles, 11 runner-ups)

Mixed doubles: 5 (4 titles, 1 runner-up)

Olympics

Singles: 1 (bronze medal)

Women's doubles: 2 (2 silver medals)

Year-end championships finals

Singles: 1 (title)

Doubles: 7 (2 titles, 5 runner-ups)

WTA career finals

Singles: 40 (24–16)

Doubles: 126 (76–50)

Performance timelines

Singles

Doubles

Mixed doubles

Awards and recognitions
 1989: WTA Doubles Team of the Year with Helena Suková
 1990: WTA Doubles Team of the Year with Helena Suková
 1991: WTA Doubles Team of the Year with Gigi Fernández
 1996: WTA Doubles Team of the Year with Arantxa Sánchez Vicario
 1997: ITF World Champions (Women's Doubles) with Lindsay Davenport
 1998: WTA Doubles Team of the Year with Martina Hingis
 2005: International Tennis Hall of Fame

WTA Tour career earnings

Head-to-head vs. top 10 ranked players

Novotná, Jana